BAMMA (British Association of Mixed Martial Arts) was a mixed martial arts promotion based in the United Kingdom. It premiered on June 27, 2009, and was shown on the television channel Bravo. BAMMA events were shown live on ITV4 in the UK and Ireland, KIX in Asia (in Indonesia aired on tvOne), VEQTA Digital Broadcast Sports Network in India, Kwese in Africa, DAZN in Germany & Russia, FITE TV and UNILAD (Online). BAMMA events stream live on the UNILAD Facebook Page (Prelims) and ITV4 (UK) & Fite.tv (US) (Main Card). BAMMA 29 was shown on free to air broadcaster Dave (TV channel), and BAMMA 30 was also shown there on 7 July 2017 as was BAMMA 31. BAMMA 33 was shown on ITV4 on December 15 2017.  The last BAMMA event was held in London on June 28, 2018.

History
BAMMA held its first event in London on June 27, 2009. BAMMA 1: The Fighting Premiership was held in a tournament format, with two semi-finals taking place in the Lightweight, Welterweight and Middleweight divisions. The semi-final winners progressed to the final, which is to take place at a later date. Their next event, BAMMA 2: Roundhouses at the Roundhouse, was held at The Roundhouse and saw BAMMA's first champions crowned. Rob Sinclair defeated Nathan Beer to become the Lightweight Champion, and Alan Omer got the better of Paul Reed for the Featherweight Championship.

After this, BAMMA moved to Birmingham for BAMMA 3: Horwich vs. Watson which hosted three title fights. Originally, tabloid celebrity Alex Reid was set to fight Tom "Kong" Watson for the vacant Middleweight title. However, Reid injured his knee while filming his documentary TV series Alex Reid: The Fight of His Life and was forced to pull out of the fight. This angered Watson, who claimed Reid was disrespecting him. Watson also called him a "clown" and said that it was likely Reid pulled out to avoid an embarrassing defeat. Reid was then replaced by UFC and IFL veteran Matt Horwich for the main event. Watson won the fight by decision and claimed the belt.

In the Featherweight division, Omer lost his belt to Mark Adams via unanimous decision. Also, Daniel Weichel was brought over from Germany to challenge Sinclair's reign as Lightweight Champ. Sinclair, who used the England football anthem "Three Lions" as his entrance music, successfully defended his title by TKOing Weichel in the first round. A number of other big names also filled the card, including Seth Petruzelli and War Machine, and around 5,000 fans were in attendance that night.

At BAMMA 4: Reid vs. Watson, Reid finally got the chance to take on Watson in a championship bout, but "Kong" was able to defend his title by winning via unanimous decision. Also featured on the card that night were three of Europe's most promising welterweights in Eugene Fadiora, Gunnar Nelson and Simeon Thoresen. BAMMA 4: Reid vs. Watson gained a huge TV audience breaking records for Bravo and becoming one of the most watched MMA bouts in UK history. The main event peaked with over 835,000 viewers during the fight, making it the most watched MMA event in UK history.

BAMMA's next event BAMMA 5 was originally planned for December 2010 and was set to be headlined by Bob Sapp vs. Stav Economou. However, due to snowstorms in the UK the event was cancelled. It was rescheduled for February 26, 2011, at the MEN Arena in Manchester with Paul Daley taking on Yuya Shirai for the BAMMA Welterweight title

It was announced on January 27, 2011, that BAMMA had signed a 1-year deal with SyFy to broadcast all 5 of their arena events in 2011, completely live on the channel in the UK. This is an unprecedented deal which makes BAMMA the first ever MMA organisation in the UK to deliver totally live coverage on a non-subscription channel.

BAMMA 6 took place at Wembley Arena on May 21, 2011, and featured a title defence by Tom Watson. It was announced on March 16, 2011, that Tom Watson would face Murilo Rua. Rumours began to circulate that wrestler Dave Batista would make his MMA debut at BAMMA 6. However this was not the case, instead UFC veterans Frank Trigg and Ivan Salaverry took part at the event, posting a win and a loss respectively.

At BAMMA 7, they held their first British title fight, where Welsh Middleweight Jack Marshman became the first British Middleweight Champion.

On November 14, 2011, "Inside MMA", announced that HDNet, the network that shows Inside MMA and promotions such as ProElite's and DREAM's live events has signed an agreement with BAMMA to air their events, beginning with BAMMA 8. A few weeks later BAMMA announced that they signed a 10 event deal with Canada's The Fight Network.

In Brazil, TV Esporte Interativo signed an agreement with BAMMA to air their events in 2012

This MMA organisation will partner Rizin Fighting Federation for the RIZIN FIGHTING WORLD GRAND-PRIX event to be held on December 29 and 31 2015. The former Pride FC Heavyweight champion Fedor Emelianenko will headline the NYE Rizin FF main event.

Channel 5 TV deal

In a major deal to bring mixed martial arts into the British mainstream, BAMMA announced that they have signed a deal with Channel 5. They held their first event under the deal, BAMMA 10, on their sister channel '5*' with Channel 5 televising a highlights package the following week. The main event saw Rob Sinclair successfully defend his Lightweight title against The Ultimate Fighter: United States vs. United Kingdom finalist and UFC veteran Andre Winner.

BAMMA announced during mid July that they had renewed their deal with Lonsdale.

Aaron Chalmers 
In May of 2017, reality TV star Aaron Chalmers debuted with the promotion, using his popularity from Geordie Shore to bring new fans to the promotion's live and televised events. After going 3-0 with the promotion, BAMMA released Chalmers for a one-fight deal with Bellator MMA on a co-promoted card. 

Chalmers spoke out about contract wranglings with the company, before eventually signing for Bellator after a "long-winded process" with the UK promotion.

Broadcast Team

BAMMA Safety Standards in MMA

On October 25, 2012, it was announced that, along with Cage Warriors and Ultimate Challenge MMA, that BAMMA have united with The Centre of Health and Human Performance in London to launched SAFE MMA, a nonprofit organization established to improve the safety of MMA fighters in the U.K. Chief among the organization's plans is a centralized and confidential database for fighter medical records. SAFE MMA, which officially launches Jan. 1 2013, also will provide affordable, standardized blood and medical tests for all registered fighters, as well as advice from leading world experts in sports medicine, according to today's announcement.

In 2016 BAMMA went one step further and introduced new safety standards for its MMA shows, with the inclusion of pre and post fight MRi & MRA scans, making it the most upscaled medical provision for any UK and European MMA promotion

Rules

BAMMA's are based upon the Unified Rules of Mixed Martial Arts that were originally established by the New Jersey State Athletic Control Board and modified by the Nevada State Athletic Commission. These rules have been adopted across the US in other states that regulate mixed martial arts. As a result, they have become the standard de facto set of rules for professional mixed martial arts across the US and for cage-based MMA worldwide.

All BAMMA fights are contested over three, five-minute rounds. There is a one-minute rest period in-between rounds. As per the Unified Rules of MMA, BAMMA only allows competitors to fight in approved shorts, without shoes or any other sort of foot padding. Fighters must use approved light gloves (4-6 ounces) that allow fingers to grab. The referee has the right to stop the fighters and stand them up if they reach a stalemate on the ground (where neither are in a dominant position nor working toward one) after a verbal warning.

Match outcome
Matches usually end via:
Submission: a fighter taps on the mat or his opponent three times (or more) or verbally submits.
Knockout: a fighter falls from a legal blow and is either unconscious or unable to immediately continue.
Technical Knockout: stoppage of the fight by the referee if it is determined a fighter cannot "intelligently defend" himself or by ringside doctor due to injury.
Judges' Decision: Depending on scoring, a match may end as:
unanimous decision (all three judges score a win for one fighter),
split decision (two judges score a win for one fighter with the third for the other),
majority decision (two judges score a win for one fighter with one for a draw),
unanimous draw (all three judges score a draw),
majority draw (two judges score a draw).
split draw (the total points for each fighter is equal)

A fight can also end in a technical decision, technical draw, disqualification, forfeit or no contest.

Judging criteria
The ten-point must system is used for all BAMMA fights; three judges score each round and the winner of each receives ten points, the loser nine points or less. If the round is even, both fighters receive ten points. The decision is announced at the end of the match but the judge's scorecards are not announced.

Fouls
The following are considered fouls in BAMMA:

 Butting with the head.
 Eye gouging of any kind.
 Biting.
 Hair pulling.
 Fish hooking.
 Groin attacks of any kind.
 Putting a finger into any orifice or into any cut or laceration on an opponent. (see Gouging)
 Small joint manipulation.
 Striking to the spine or the back of the head. (see Rabbit punch)
 Striking downward using the point of the elbow. (see Elbow (strike))
 Throat strikes of any kind, including, without limitation, grabbing the trachea.
 Clawing, pinching or twisting the flesh.
 Grabbing the clavicle.
 Kicking the head of a grounded opponent.
 Kneeing the head of a grounded opponent.
 Stomping a grounded opponent.
 Kicking to the kidney with the heel.
 Spiking an opponent to the canvas on his head or neck. (see piledriver (professional wrestling))
 Throwing an opponent out of the ring or fenced area.
 Holding the shorts or gloves of an opponent.
 Spitting at an opponent.
 Engaging in an unsportsmanlike conduct that causes an injury to an opponent.
 Holding the ropes or the fence.
 Using abusive language in the ring or fenced area.
 Attacking an opponent on or during the break.
 Attacking an opponent who is under the care of the referee.
 Attacking an opponent after the bell has sounded the end of the period of unarmed combat.
 Flagrantly disregarding the instructions of the referee.
 Timidity, including, without limitation, avoiding contact with an opponent, intentionally or consistently dropping the mouthpiece or faking an injury.
 Interference by the corner.
 Throwing in the towel during competition.

When a foul is charged, the referee in their discretion may deduct one or more points as a penalty. If a foul incapacitates a fighter, then the match may end in a disqualification if the foul was intentional, or a no contest if unintentional. If a foul causes a fighter to be unable to continue later in the bout, it ends with a technical decision win to the injured fighter if the injured fighter is ahead on points, otherwise it is a technical draw.

Current Champions

BAMMA Champions

RDX Champions

BAMMA Title history

BAMMA World Heavyweight Championship
206 to 265 lbs (93 to 120 kg)

BAMMA World Light Heavyweight Championship
186 to 205 lbs (84 to 93 kg)

BAMMA World Middleweight Championship
171 to 185 lbs (77 to 84 kg)

BAMMA World Welterweight Championship
156 to 170 lbs

BAMMA World Lightweight Championship
146 to 155 lbs (66 to 70 kg)

BAMMA World Featherweight Championship
136 to 145 lbs (61 to 66 kg)

BAMMA World Bantamweight Championship
126 to 135 lbs (58 to 60 kg)

BAMMA World Flyweight Championship
116 to 125 lbs (53 to 57 kg)

RDX Title history

RDX Heavyweight Championship
206 to 265 lb (93 to 120) kg

RDX Middleweight Championship
171 to 185 lbs (77 to 84 kg)

RDX Welterweight Championship
156 to 170 lbs (71 to 77 kg)

RDX Lightweight Championship
146 to 155 lbs (66 to 70 kg)

RDX Bantamweight Championship
126 to 135 lbs (58 to 60 kg)

RDX Flyweight Championship
up to 125 lbs (58 kg)

Events

Scheduled events

Past events

External links
 
BAMMA event results at Sherdog

References

2009 establishments in the United Kingdom
Mixed martial arts organizations
Sports organisations of the United Kingdom
Sports organizations established in 2009
Mixed martial arts events lists